Kapheleis was a polis (city-state) in Ainis in ancient Thessaly.

It is unlocated.

References

Populated places in ancient Thessaly
Thessalian city-states
Former populated places in Greece
Ainis
Lost ancient cities and towns